The Congress of the State of Guanajuato is the legislative branch of  the government of the State of Guanajuato. The Congress is the governmental deliberative body of Guanajuato, which is equal to, and independent of, the executive.

The Congress is unicameral and its current session consists of 36 local deputies (22 elected by the first-past-the-post system and 14 by proportional representation). Deputies are elected to serve for a three-year term.

Since its installation the congress has been renewed 63 times, hence the current session of the Congress of Guanajuato (whose term lasts form to 2018 to 2021) is known as the LXIV Legislature.

See also
List of Mexican state congresses

References

External links
Congress of Guanajuato website

 
Guanajuato, Congress of
Guanajuato